Charley Ross may refer to:
Charles J. Ross, (b 1859) American actor, vaudeville entertainer, and producer often referred to in publications as Charley Ross
Kidnapping of Charley Ross, (b 1874)